Bridgehampton Race Circuit was a race track located near Sag Harbor, New York, United States. The circuit opened in 1957, following a series of road races held from 1949 until 1953. It was one of the first permanent road racing venues in the United States, opening after Thompson Speedway, two years after Road America, the year after Watkins Glen International, and the same year as Lime Rock Park and Laguna Seca Raceway.   In its early years, Bridgehampton was host to major international series, including the World Sportscar Championship, Can-Am, and NASCAR Grand National.  By the early 1970s, the track was used mostly for amateur events. The track closed permanently in 1999.

Bridgehampton was renowned as a fearsome course, requiring the utmost of driver skill.

Lap Records
The official race lap records at Bridgehampton Race Circuit are listed as:

History

Early road races

The first road races in Bridgehampton were held on public roads around the hamlet of Bridgehampton from 1915 until 1921.  The course ran counterclockwise on an approximately 3-mile (4.8-km) rectangle, beginning on Montauk Highway, then turning left onto Halsey Lane, left onto Pauls Lane, left onto Ocean Boulevard, and left back onto Montauk Highway.

The races were revived in 1949, utilizing a 4-mile (6.4-km) circuit adjacent to the pre-war circuit in Bridgehampton and Sagaponack.  It ran clockwise beginning on Ocean Road, turning right onto Sagaponack Road, right onto Sagaponack Main Street, right onto Bridge Lane, and right back onto Ocean Road.  The races proved successful, and joined the SCCA National Sports Car Championship when it was created in 1951.  The road races came to an end in 1953, after a driver was killed in practice and three spectators injured during the race.  These events, combined with a spectator death in a crash at Watkins Glen in 1952, led the State of New York to ban racing on public roads.

Permanent circuit
Local racing enthusiasts formed the Bridgehampton Road Races Corporation in 1953 to finance the construction of a permanent race circuit in the area. Although construction was not completed, the first races were held in 1957. The headline event, the Bridgehampton Sports Car Races, were a part of the SCCA National Championship; Regional races would be added in 1958. The race would shift to the professional United States Road Racing Championship in 1965, and resurrected the Vanderbilt Cup, which had been run on Long Island from 1904 until 1910. A second National event was added in 1961. This event would shift to the World Sportscar Championship for 1962, marking Bridgehampton's biggest event. The WSC gave way to Can-Am from 1966 until 1969. Can-Am was scheduled to return in 1970, but the race was moved to the newly opened Road Atlanta after heavy storms damaged the track. A 1971 IMSA GT Championship event was the last major event at the track.

Decline and demise
Bridgehampton's included a small media and scoring building and a small grandstand. The Bridgehampton Road Races Corporation did not have the money to upgrade and maintain the tracks infrastructure to world-class standards. The track's land had appreciated to several million dollars in a few decades. Locals began complaining about noise in the mid-1970s, and in 1983 the town passed an ordinance limiting noise and effectively ending any chance of big-league racing returning. Plans were announced in 1994 to turn the property into a golf course. Races continued until 1997, and a racing school and club meets lingered until 1998. A portion of the course, including the Chevron Bridge, are preserved on the grounds of the golf course.

Events
Bridgehampton Sports Car Races; SCCA National Sports Car Championship, United States Road Racing Championship
Bridgehampton Grand Prix; Can-Am, World Sportscar Championship

NASCAR Grand National results

Trans-Am results

References

Motorsport venues in New York (state)
Defunct motorsport venues in the United States
1957 establishments in New York (state)
1998 disestablishments in New York (state)
Sports venues in Suffolk County, New York
IMSA GT Championship circuits
Sports venues completed in 1957